A bridge tender's house is a structure near or upon a moveable bridge from which a bridge tender may operate the bridge and monitor river traffic, and in which they may reside.  It may contain the controls and the mechanicals to operate the bridge.

References

External links

Moveable bridges
Bridge components